Bucculatrix unipuncta is a moth in the family Bucculatricidae. It is found in the West Indies. The species was described by Thomas de Grey, 6th Baron Walsingham in 1897.

References

Bucculatricidae
Moths described in 1897
Taxa named by Thomas de Grey, 6th Baron Walsingham
Moths of the Caribbean